Adventure Time: Fionna and Cake is an upcoming American animated streaming television series. It is a spin off of the Cartoon Network series Adventure Time, which was created by Pendleton Ward. The third series in the franchise, it was announced on August 17, 2021 and will be released via HBO Max. The show will focus on the titular characters, Fionna the Human and Cake the Cat, alternative versions of main characters from the original series who had previously appeared in several episodes. The series will be executive produced by Adam Muto, who had served as showrunner for the latter half of Adventure Time and oversaw production of the Distant Lands specials. Ten half-hour episodes have been confirmed.

Production

Concept

The idea for "Fionna the Human" and "Cake the Cat" evolved from drawings that Adventure Time character designer and storyboard revisionist Natasha Allegri had posted online during the show's earliest seasons. Reception to the gender-swapped characters was so positive that the Adventure Time producers decided to write the characters into the series. They debuted in season three's "Fionna and Cake", which functioned as both "a jab [and] a huge celebration of,  the feeling of being a fan" and "allowing something completely ridiculous to make your heart tighten". The characters would make additional appearances in season five's "Bad Little Boy", season six's "The Prince Who Wanted Everything", season eight's "Five Short Tables", and season nine's "Fionna and Cake and Fionna".

Cast
 Madeleine Martin as Fionna
 Roz Ryan as Cake
 Tom Kenny as Simon Petrikov

Synopsis
Adventure Time: Fionna and Cake is a spin-off of Adventure Time, the latter of which follows the adventures of Finn the Human and Jake the Dog. This series follows Finn and Jake's gender-swapped complements, Fionna the Human and Cake the Cat. The series also stars Simon Petrikov, a character who for most of Adventure Time had been well known as the Ice King. Adventure Time: Fionna and Cake sees the trio travel throughout the multiverse, while also being chased by "a powerful new antagonist" who is "determined to track them down and erase them from existence."

References

External links

2020s American television series debuts
2020s American animated television series
Adventure Time
American animated television spin-offs
HBO Max original programming
American children's animated adventure television series
American children's animated comedy television series
American children's animated fantasy television series
Animated television series about cats
English-language television shows
Post-apocalyptic animated television series
Upcoming animated television series
Television series by Cartoon Network Studios